Use of the Internet in Yemen began in 1996 through the ISPs TeleYemen and the Public Telecommunications Corporation. By July 2016 6,732,928 people (24.6% of total pre-civil war population) were Internet users.

Growth
Rapid development of the telecommunications and information technology sectors in Yemen occurred from 2000 to 2005. The extent of investments in infrastructure development of telecom and IT systems came to more than YR 80 billion, in addition to loans of $31 million by the South Korean government. The number of Internet users was 3,597,097 in 2011 up from 110,000 in 2006, and 3,800 in 1991. This represents 14.9% of Yemen's 2011 population. The number of subscribers to cellular telephone networks came to 11.7 million in 2011, up from 1.2 million in early 2006, and 153,000 in 1991.

There has been a huge demand for faster Internet connections in Yemen, and that pushed the two ISPs, TeleYemen, operators of the service YNET, and YemenNet, through the state's powerful Ministry of Telecommunications, to introduce  ADSL and ISDN connections. Also, the E-government project that started to give the citizens the ability to access web services and finalize G2C transactions in 2000 increased the number of Internet users dramatically. But still the quality of speed is not that up to the mark. There were 84,000 fixed broadband subscriptions in 2010.

Censorship 

In a report by the OpenNet Initiative in October 2012, Yemen is listed as engaged in pervasive Internet censorship in social and political areas such as restrictions to Internet collaboration tools and in the conflict/security area.

Yemen was included in Reporters Without Borders list of countries "under surveillance" in 2008 and 2009, but not in 2010 or 2011.

Yemen censors pornography, nudity, gay and lesbian content, escort and dating services, sites displaying provocative attire, Web sites which present critical reviews of Islam and/or attempt to convert Muslims to other religions, or content related to alcohol, gambling, and drugs.

Yemen’s Ministry of Information declared in April 2008 that the penal code will be used to prosecute writers who publish Internet content that "incites hatred" or "harms national interests". Yemen's two ISPs, YemenNet and TeleYemen, block access to gambling, adult, sex education, and some religious content. The ISP TeleYemen (aka Y.Net) prohibits "sending any message which is offensive on moral, religious, communal, or political grounds" and will report "any use or attempted use of the Y.Net service which contravenes any applicable Law of the Republic of Yemen". TeleYemen reserves the right to control access to data stored in its system “in any manner deemed appropriate by TeleYemen.”

In Yemen closed rooms or curtains that might obstruct views of the monitors are not allowed in Internet cafés, computer screens in Internet cafés must be visible to the floor supervisor, police have ordered some Internet cafés to close at midnight, and demanded that users show their identification cards to the café operator.

In March 2015, the Ministry of Yemen denied any plans to block Facebook after the last control by Houthis, though it has become apparent that the government applied bandwidth control filter to Facebook website in particular.

AdenNet
Following the 2014 Battle of Sana'a, Houthi rebels took control of YemenNet, the country's major internet service provider. Government forces aligned with Abdrabbuh Mansur Hadi created AdenNet in June 2018 as an alternative ISP.

See also
 Telecommunications in Yemen

References

Telecommunications in Yemen
Science and technology in Yemen
Yemen
Yemen